Shughur Tahtani, also known as Ain al-Souda or Arzghan Tahtani, is a Syrian village located in Jisr al-Shughur Nahiyah in Jisr al-Shughur District, Idlib.  According to the Syria Central Bureau of Statistics (CBS), Shughur Tahtani had a population of 1599 in the 2004 census.

References 

Populated places in Jisr al-Shughur District